Zulu may refer to:

Zulu people
 Zulu Kingdom or Zulu Empire, a former monarchy in what is now South Africa
 Zulu language, a Bantu language spoken in southern Africa
 Zulu people, an ethnic group of southern Africa

Arts, entertainment, and media

Films
 Zulu (1964 film), a war film starring Stanley Baker and Michael Caine
 Zulu (2013 film), a French crime film starring Forest Whitaker and Orlando Bloom

Music
 "Zulu" (song), a 1981 dance single by British funk duo The Quick
 "Zulu", a song by Blink-182 from the 1996 EP They Came to Conquer... Uranus
 Zulu Records, a record store in Vancouver, British Columbia, Canada

Other uses in arts, entertainment, and media
Zulu (Pillow Pal), a Pillow Pal zebra made by Ty, Inc.
 TV 2 Zulu, a Danish television station
 Zulu Social Aid & Pleasure Club, a Carnival krewe in New Orleans

People
 Zulu (surname), a surname (including a list of people with the name)
 Gilbert Lani Kauhi (1937–2004), stage name Zulu, who played Kono in the original Hawaii Five-O series
 Zulu kaMalandela, founder (c. 1709) and chief of the Zulu clan
 Zulu Sofola (1935–1995), professor and the first published female Nigerian playwright and dramatist
 Shaka Zulu (c. 1787 – 1828), leader of the Zulu Kingdom

Places
 Zulu, Indiana, a town in the United States
 1922 Zulu, an asteroid

Military
 Battle Force Zulu, U.S. Navy carrier task force designation (including a list of them)
 , three ships of the British Royal Navy
 Task Force Zulu, a South African Defence Force unit in Operation Savannah
Zulu-class submarine, a Soviet attack submarine class built in the 1950s

Science and technology
 Zulü, an approximation of pi
 Zulu, a variant of the 1910s Sunbeam Crusader motorcycle engine
Alaena, a genus of butterflies in the family Lycaenidae commonly called zulus
 Azul Zulu, a binary build of OpenJDK (a Java implementation) developed by Azul Systems
Torbenia, a genus of butterflies in the family Lycaenidae commonly called zulus
 Zulu sheep, a breed raised primarily by the Zulu people in Southern Africa 
 Zulu time, more commonly known as UTC, for the Z in TZ timestamps

Other uses
 Z, pronounced "Zulu" in the NATO phonetic alphabet
 Zulu, a type of boat used in the Scottish east coast fishery
 The Zulus, a former football team in Sheffield, England
 The Birmingham Zulu Warriors, a football hooligan firm associated with Birmingham City FC

See also
 Amazulu (disambiguation)
 Zululand (disambiguation)
 Sulu (disambiguation)

Language and nationality disambiguation pages